Cannabis regulatory agencies exist in several of the U.S. states and territories, the one federal district, and several areas under tribal sovereignty in the United States which have legalized cannabis. In November 2020, 19 state agencies formed the Cannabis Regulators Association.

The agencies include:

Federal
Drug Enforcement Administration
Food and Drug Administration
United States Department of Agriculture (hemp)
Cannabis Justice Office (grantmaking office, proposed under Marijuana Opportunity Reinvestment and Expungement Act of 2019)

Territorial or Federal district
Commonwealth of Northern Mariana Islands Cannabis Commission (in formation as of October 2018 pursuant to CNMI Cannabis Act of 2018)
District of Columbia Alcoholic Beverage Regulation Administration (was Department of Health Division of Medical Marijuana and Integrative Therapy until October 1, 2020); medical cannabis only –  there is no regulatory agency for other use
Puerto Rico Medical Cannabis Regulatory Board (a division of the Puerto Rico Department of Health). The Board was created in 2017 under the MEDICINAL Act of 2017.

State
 Alabama Medical Cannabis Commission (as of 13 September 2021, since 8/3/2021, agency has met 3x regular, 2x special/called, but does not yet have a website)

Alaska Marijuana Control Board (MCB)
Arizona Department of Health Services (under 2020 Arizona Proposition 207)
California Bureau of Cannabis Control
San Francisco Office of Cannabis
Colorado Department of Revenue Enforcement Division Marijuana Enforcement (MED)
Connecticut Department of Consumer Protection
Georgia Access to Medical Cannabis Commission
Illinois Department of Financial and Professional Regulation, Cannabis Regulation Oversight Officer
Iowa Medical Cannabidiol Board
Maine Office of Marijuana Policy
Maryland Medical Cannabis Commission
Massachusetts Cannabis Control Commission
Michigan Cannabis Regulatory Agency
Montana Department of Revenue
Nevada Department of Taxation
New Jersey Cannabis Regulatory Commission
New Mexico Cannabis Control Division
New York Office of Cannabis Management
Ohio Department of Commerce
Ohio Medical Marijuana Control Program
Oklahoma Medical Marijuana Authority
Oregon Liquor Control Commission
Rhode Island Office of Cannabis Regulation
Virginia Cannabis Control Authority
Washington State Liquor and Cannabis Board
West Virginia Department of Health and Human Resources
Bureau for Public Health
Office of Medical Cannabis

Proposed
Alabama Medical Cannabis Commission
Arkansas Bureau of Cannabis Control
Delaware Office of Marijuana Control Commissioner
Hawaii Department of Taxation
Indiana Cannabis Compliance Commission
Kentucky Department of Alcoholic Beverage and Cannabis Control
Louisiana Office of Alcohol and Tobacco Control
Minnesota 
Cannabis Management Board
Cannabis Management Office
Ohio Department of Commerce
Division of Cannabis Control (Regulate Cannabis Like Alcohol initiative)
Pennsylvania Cannabis Regulatory Control Board
Vermont Cannabis Control Board

Tribal
Eastern Band of Cherokee Indians  Cannabis Commission
Puyallup Tribal Cannabis Committee, Puyallup Tribe, Washington
Squaxin Island Tribe, Washington
Suquamish Tribe has direct tribal council control via Suquamish Evergreen Corporation (Washington)
Tulalip Tribal Cannabis Agency, Tulalip Tribes of Washington, became the first tribal regulatory agency in mid-2018
 Cannabis Compliance Office reporting to the Saint Regis Mohawk Tribe Cannabis Control Board
 Swinomish Tribe Swinomish Development Authority

See also
Legality of cannabis by U.S. jurisdiction
List of Canadian cannabis regulatory agencies
Mexican Cannabis Institute

Notes

References

Cannabis regulatory agencies
Regulatory agencies
United States regulatory agencies